Anthony Musaba (born 6 December 2000) is a Dutch professional footballer who plays as a forward for Dutch club NEC on loan from Monaco.

Career

NEC Nijmegen
In early April 2019, after making the first-team squad during the season, Musaba was one of four trainees to sign a new contract with NEC Nijmegen. In the same month, he made his professional debut in an Eerste Divisie match against FC Volendam.

He scored 7 goals and made 5 assists in 25 Eerste Divisie appearances in the 2019–20 season, which was cut short due to the COVID-19 pandemic and which was his first full season.

Monaco
In June 2020, Ligue 1 club AS Monaco FC announced the signing of Musaba on a five-year contract. The transfer fee paid to NEC Nijmegen was reported as €2 to 2.5 million.

On 24 August 2020, he was loaned to Cercle Brugge.

On 31 August 2021, he was loaned to Heerenveen.

On 29 August 2022, he joined Metz on loan with an option to buy. On 4 January 2023, Musaba returned to NEC on loan.

Personal life
Musaba was born to Congolese parents. His twin brother Richie is also a professional footballer.

References

Living people
2000 births
People from Beuningen
Dutch people of Democratic Republic of the Congo descent
Dutch footballers
Footballers from Gelderland
Association football forwards
Eredivisie players
Eerste Divisie players
Belgian Pro League players
Ligue 2 players
NEC Nijmegen players
AS Monaco FC players
Cercle Brugge K.S.V. players
SC Heerenveen players
FC Metz players
Dutch expatriate sportspeople in Monaco
Dutch expatriate sportspeople in France
Dutch expatriate sportspeople in Belgium
Expatriate footballers in Monaco
Expatriate footballers in France
Expatriate footballers in Belgium
Dutch twins
Twin sportspeople